Piatykhatky is a small city and a large railway junction in Kamianske Raion, Dnipropetrovsk Oblast (province) of Ukraine. It hosts the administration of Piatykhatky urban hromada, one of the hromadas of Ukraine. Population: . Population in 2001 was 20,563.

Until 18 July 2020, Piatykhatky was the administrative center of Piatykhatky Raion. The raion was abolished in July 2020 as part of the administrative reform of Ukraine, which reduced the number of raions of Dnipropetrovsk Oblast to seven. The area of Piatykhatky Raion was merged into Kamianske Raion.

Gallery

References

Notes

Sources
 

Cities in Dnipropetrovsk Oblast
Yekaterinoslav Governorate
Cities of district significance in Ukraine
Populated places established in the Russian Empire